Boydell is an English surname.

Boydell may also refer to:

People
 Brian Boydell (1917–2000), Irish composer
 Jacqui Boydell (born 1968), Australian politician
 James Boydell (died 1860), British inventor 
 John Boydell (1720–1804), British publisher 
 Josiah Boydell (1752–1817), British publisher and painter
 Phillip Boydell (1896–1984), British designer and illustrator

Other uses
 Boydell Shakespeare Gallery, museum
 Boydell & Brewer, English book publishing company 
Boydell Press, one of the two companies which merged to form Boydell & Brewer
 William C. Boydell House, in Detroit, Michigan, USA
 Boydell Glacier, on Trinity Peninsula in northern Graham Land in the Antarctic